Pogonognathellus is a genus of arthropods belonging to the family Tomoceridae. 

Species:
 Pogonognathellus flavescens
 Pogonognathellus longicornis

References

Collembola
Springtail genera